Paasselkä devils (Finnish) – Spectral fire
 Pamola (Abenaki) – Weather spirit
 Panes (Greek) – Human-goat hybrids descended from the god Pan
 Pandi (Medieval Bestiary) – White-haired humanoid with giant ears and eight fingers and toes
 Panis (Hindu) – Demons with herds of stolen cows
 Panlong (Chinese) – Water dragon
 Panotti (Medieval Bestiaries) – Humanoid with gigantic ears
 Panther (Medieval Bestiaries) – Feline with sweet breath
 Parandrus (Medieval Bestiaries) – Shapeshifting animal whose natural form was a large ruminant
 Pard (Medieval Bestiaries) – Fast, spotted feline believed to mate with lions to produce leopards
 Pardalokampoi (Etruscan) – Fish-tailed leopard
 Patagon (Medieval folklore) – Giant race reputed to live in the area of Patagonia
 Patasola (Latin America) – Anthropophagous, one-legged humanoid
 Patupairehe (Māori) – White-skinned nature spirits
 Pech (Scottish) – Strong little people
 Pegaeae (Greek) – Spring nymph
 Pegasus (Greek) – Winged horse
 Pegacorn – Pegasus-unicorn hybrid 
 Pelesit (Malay) – Servant spirit
 Peluda (French) – Dragon
 Penanggalan (Malay) – Vampires that sever their heads from their bodies to fly around, usually with their intestines or other internal organs trailing behind
 Peng (Chinese) – Giant bird
 Penghou (Chinese) – Tree spirit
 Peri (Persian) – Winged humanoid
 Peryton (Allegedly Medieval folklore) – Deer-bird hybrid
 Pesanta (Catalan) – Nightmare demon in the form of a cat or dog
 Peuchen (Chilota and Mapuche) – Vampiric, flying, shapeshifting serpent
 Phi Tai Hong (Thai)  – Ghost of a person who has died suddenly of a violent or cruel death
 Phoenix (Phoenician) – Regenerative bird reborn from its own ashes
 Piasa (Native American mythology) – Winged, antlered feline-like dragon
 Piatek (Armenian) – Large land animal
 Pictish Beast (Pictish stones) – Stylistic animal, possibly a dragon
 Pillan (Mapuche) – Nature spirit
 Pim-skwa-wagen-owad (Abenaki) – Water spirit
 Piru (Finnish) – Minor demon
 Pishacha (Hindu) – Carrion-eating demon
 Pishtaco (Peru) – Monster man that steals its victim's body fat for cannibalistic purposes
 Pita-skog (Abenaki) – Serpentine rain spirit
 Pixie (Cornish) – Little people and nature spirits
 Pixiu (Chinese) – Winged lion
 Pi yao (Chinese) – Horned, dragon-lion hybrid
 Plakavac (Slavic) – Vampire created when a mother strangles her child
 Pok-wejee-men (Abenaki) – Tree spirit
 Polevik (Polish) – Little people and field spirits
 Pollo Maligno (Colombian) – Man-eating chicken spirit
 Polong (Malay) – Invisible servant spirit
 Poltergeist (German) – Ghost that moves objects
 Pombero (Guaraní) – Wild man and nature spirit
 Ponaturi (Māori) – Grotesque, malevolent humanoid
 Pontianak (Malay) – Undead, vampiric women who died in childbirth
 Pope Lick Monster (American Folklore) Kentucky Urban Legend – Cryptid, a murderous creature that is part man, sheep, and goat 
 Poukai (Māori) – Giant bird
 Preta (Buddhist, Hindu, and Jain) – Ghosts of especially greedy people
 Pricolici (Romanian – Roman) – Undead wolf
 Psoglav (Serbia) – Dog-headed monster
 Psotnik (Slavic) – Mischievous spirit
 Psychai (Greek) – Butterfly-winged nymphs, daughters of Psyche
 Psychopomp (Greek) – Creatures, spirits, angels, or deities in many religions who escort newly deceased souls from Earth to the afterlife
 Púca (Welsh) – Shapeshifting animal spirit
 Púki (Icelandic) – Malevolent little person
 Puck (English) – House spirit
 Putz (German) – House spirit
 Pugot (Philippine) – Headless humanoid
 Puk (Frisian) – House spirit 
 Pūķis (Latvian) – Dragon
 Puckwudgie (Native American mythology) – Troll-like gray-skinned being
 Pygmy (Greek) – Little people
 Pyrausta (Greek) – Insect-dragon hybrid
 Python (Greek) – Serpentine dragon

P